The U.P. College of Science is one of the several colleges (or degree-granting units) of the University of the Philippines Diliman, the flagship campus of the University of the Philippines System.

The college is not only one of the largest, but also a foremost pacesetter of academic excellence in the university due its recognition as the national center of excellence in academics and research in the field of natural sciences and mathematics, and has the largest concentration of Ph.D. holders in its faculty in the whole country.

The college is composed of eight institutes, two inter-programs and three affiliated units.

Organization

Institutes
National Institute of Geological Science (NIGS)
National Institute of Physics (NIP)
National Institute of Molecular Biology and Biotechnology (NIMBB)
Institute of Biology (IB)
Institute of Chemistry (IC)
Institute of Mathematics (IM)
Marine Science Institute (MSI)
Institute of Environmental Science and Meteorology (IESM)

Academic Department and Interdepartmental programs
Science and Society Program (SSP)
Materials Science and Engineering Program (MSEP)

Affiliate Units
Natural Sciences Research Institute (NSRI)
Computational Science Research Center (CSRC)
UPD College of Science Library (CSLib)

Student Publication

Scientia
Scientia (Latin for science) is the official student publication of the college. It is the only student college publication which has its own office located at the basement of the CSLib Building.

National Centers of Excellence
As of 2016, the Commission on Higher Education of the Philippines has identified 23 centers of excellence (COEs) in U.P. Diliman, eight (8) of which can be found in the College of Science. (See all UP Diliman Centers of Excellence/Development).

The COEs in the college are Biology, Chemistry, Geology, Marine Science, Environmental Science, Mathematics, Molecular Biology & Biotechnology (MBB) and Physics.

Images

External links

UP College of Science

Science
Science
Educational institutions established in 1983
1983 establishments in the Philippines